James Baillieu (born 1968) is an Australian activist investor.

Family and education 
Baillieu was born in 1968 to parents Ian Baillieu, an Australian lawyer, and the art gallery owner Marianne. He is the nephew of former Premier Ted Baillieu and journalist, activist Kate Baillieu and also Olympian Will Baillieu. His grandparents were Diana and Darren Baillieu. His great-uncle was WL Baillieu.  His great-great-grandfather was James George Baillieu who swam the Port Phillip Bay Rip and landed in Queenscliff, Victoria in 1853. The Baillieu family office Mutual Trust merged with the Myer family office in 2018 creating a firm with more than $3b under management. He is related to the Myer family including Sidney ('Bails') Myer AC and his son Rupert Myer AO and Marigold Myer AC.

Baillieu was educated at Melbourne Grammar School. He graduated from the University of Melbourne where he received a BA and LLB (First Class Honours). In his final year at law school, he broke the record for honours points.

Career 
Baillieu practiced law at Mallesons Stephen Jacques in the 1990s.

He then joined management consultants McKinsey & Co for seven years until 2001. He co-authoured a report recommending the dismantling of the New Zealand Wool Board in 2001.

He then became an investor in and consultant to early stage technology businesses, and later an investor in and Senior Vice President of Aconex (ASX: ACX) which was purchased by Oracle for A$1.6b In December 2016.

It has been reported that Baillieu is an active investor in early stage businesses including InsightTimer, LithodomosVR, and SportsChamps.

From November 2017 to February 2019 he was Chairman of ASX-listed BidEnergy and also its largest shareholder. The Australian Financial Review reported when Baillieu became Chairman the company was foundering. But under Baillieu, BidEnergy was the top performing stock on the ASX in 2018.

In September 2019 Baillieu became Chairman of ASX-listed Candy Club and made an investment of $3 million. Candy Club was the best performing stock on the ASX that day - up 74% on the news of Baillieu's appointment. In March 2021 it was reported Candy Club shares were up 700% in a year under Baillieu. However, as at December 2021 the shares had fallen back and were only up 200% from their lows.

Notable legal matters 
Baillieu is described by the Australian Financial Review as “seriously combative". He is described by The Age as "the Baillieu family's chief spear thrower" with "an open approach to conflict". He is described by The Australian as an activist investor who “targets the good fight.” 

Baillieu uses Herbert Smith Freehills as his legal advisors of record and below are some of his legal matters.

Aconex 2007 
Baillieu was involved in a dispute over a $12 million share purchase that was later settled out of Court. Aconex's CEO Leigh Jasper and Baillieu worked together at McKinsey in the 1990s.

Martin Hosking 2011 
Baillieu sought the removal of Redbubble CEO Martin Hosking as Chairman of Aconex. At one point, Baillieu threatened to bankrupt Hosking and later Hosking resigned as Chairman of Aconex.

Allens Arthur Robinson 2011 
Baillieu raised concerns about Allens Arthur Robinson's conflict of interest in being legal advisers to Aconex while Michael Robinson sat on the Board. Michael Robinson's profile was removed from the Allens Arthur Robinson website and later reinstated.

IR-exchange 2019 
Baillieu said the IR-exchange Prospectus was extraordinarily misleading and deceptive and sought to recover a $1 million investment by issuing proceedings in the Federal Court. "Their prospectus, in my opinion, could put them all in jail” Mr Baillieu said. Baillieu also informed ASIC and the company offered to refund investors and ASIC stopped the IR-exchange Prospectus. Ultimately IR-exchange paid Baillieu  $1.23 million and he said "This is a huge win for me – they're giving me absolutely everything I wanted."

On 23 October IR-exchange went into administration after a syndicate of investors filed a legal action in the NSW Federal Court. On 2 December IR-exchange went into liquidation leaving shareholders and creditors with nothing.

Misuse of the Baillieu name 2019 
Baillieu attacked the rebrand of stockbroking firm Baillieu Holst, to trade as Baillieu. According to Baillieu, "their rebrand was so dishonest, so unethical and so unlawful that we cannot accept their use of 'Baillieu' at all, they've forfeited it." He further said, "The Baillieu name has a good reputation, earned over 165 years. [Baillieu 1889] are, in my opinion, impostors with a poor reputation," 

The Australian Financial Review reported that almost a dozen Baillieu family members, including Baillieu, contacted the company alleging the name change was inappropriate and describing the company as "impostors". The Baillieu family was reported to be “absolutely furious” about it. After that the Sorrento Sailing Couta Boat Club, where the rebrand was launched, removed Baillieu Limited's umbrellas and covered up their sign.

The Age described Baillieu as "a bandit with a black pen" and said the "corporate lawyer and company director took a novel approach....to press the point" and that he walked into the foyer of 360 Collins Street and used a black Texta to black out the [Baillieu 1889] name on the building's nameplate. Baillieu said security made no attempt to stop him, and that he was “simply righting what was wrong, which is the misleading use of the family name."  The Australian Financial Review reported that  "the pièce de résistance of this whole affair is undoubtedly Baillieu having last week used black texta to scribble out his family name from the firm's Collins Street placards. Using removable marker, it seems, so you can't technically call it vandalism".

On 14 June 2019 following a campaign of legal pressure from Baillieu and his lawyers Herbert Smith Freehills urging them to change their name, the stockbrokers agreed to change their name to EL&C Baillieu with effect from 17 June to coincide with their move from 360 Collins Street to 55 Collins Street.

In 2020 EL&C Baillieu was sold to rival firm Ord Minnett after a secret tape recording sting revealed serious wrong doing under the headline “Hubris Killed EL&C Baillieu.

BidEnergy 2019 
Baillieu was sacked as Chairman of BidEnergy on 21 February 2019. A text message was sent by BidEnergy MD Guy Maine to Baillieu's wife at 12:08 am that night. The share price fell by 33% the day after Baillieu’s removal. On 5 March Baillieu raised questions about the new Chairman's credentials and the Australian Securities Exchange began an investigation. He also said he would be taking further legal action, alleging BidEnergy's directors' decision to remove him from the chairman role was in breach of their duties under the Corporations Act." Baillieu wrote a letter to all shareholders alleging that the new Chairman Dyer had made false and misleading claims about his credentials and apologized to all shareholders for Dyer's appointment to the Board. The stock fell 11% on news of Baillieu's letter. Billionaire Alex Waislitz snapped up 5.85% of BidEnergy.

The Age reported on 19 June that Dyer was taking Baillieu to Court to seek an Intervention Order to try to stop Baillieu writing to BidEnergy shareholders about Dyer's leadership.

Baillieu commenced legal proceedings in the Supreme Court against BidEnergy in an action used by shareholders to sue directors, known as a derivative action.

Baillieu claimed that Dyer was attempting to blackmail him in a "corporate war" over Baillieu's removal as Chairman of BidEnergy. It was also reported that Baillieu had called Dyer a maggot in a letter sent to the Melbourne Club.

In a court hearing Baillieu's counsel Ian Hill QC accused Dyer of an abuse of process and misleading the courts in an attempt to
protect his reputation ever since Dyer removed Baillieu as BidEnergy Chairman. It was reported Baillieu was suing to recoup $4.6 million lost on sale of a parcel of shares.

Baillieu settled all maters with BidEnergy in a confidential settlement in April 2020 and Dyer resigned as Chairman after what The Australian described as a “rocky” tenure.

As of December 2021, the BidEnergy share price was down over 80% since Baillieu’s removal as Chairman.

Updater 2019 
The Australian Financial Review reported that Baillieu had a $20 million stake and grew suspicious about the raise's progress. He sought a detailed explanation from MD David Greenberg about why it had taken so long, while foreshadowing the commencement of legal action to give him access to the company's books if he wasn't satisfied." Later he said “My very strong suspicion is the capital raise is well off track ... and then I’ve turned up acting a little bit assertive and they’ve just had a light bulb go off and have thought, ‘holy smoke, we’ve got to deliver this bad news. Let’s deliver bad news that it is his fault. It’s insane.”"

Baillieu, described the delisting as a "fizzer". “Would I prefer the delisting had never happened? Absolutely. We’ve lost liquidity for an indefinite period of time. The two key criteria for delisting – the valuation and timing for a deal – have both been missed, unless something amazing turns up,” he told AFR Weekend”

Updater said on 9 November 2019 that it had reduced operating costs and had decided that a large scale growth round was too risky but was hoping for a deal by the end of the year.  It was reported that Baillieu had sold his stake in the company.

Personal life 
Baillieu lives in Melbourne and is married to Josephine Baillieu. He takes an interest in the work of the World Wildlife Foundation which the couple supports through an annual event at their Mornington Peninsula home.

In December 2011, Baillieu and his wife Josephine hosted Mary, Crown Princess of Denmark and Frederik, Crown Prince of Denmark as guests for a week in a secret visit to their Mornington Peninsula home.

His son Atlas was the national Australian Junior Chess Champion.

Baillieu is an author on publication Crikey.

References 

1968 births
Australian billionaires
Living people
20th-century Australian lawyers
University of Melbourne alumni
People educated at Melbourne Grammar School